Biogeographia: The Journal of Integrative Biogeography is a peer-reviewed open access scientific journal publishing original research and reviews in biogeography since 1970. It is published on behalf of the Italian Biogeography Society (Società Italiana di Biogeografia), using the eScholarship Publishing platform. The current editor-in-chief is Diego Fontaneto.

Abstracting and indexing 
The journal is abstracted and indexed in:

Notable articles
The four most highly cited papers with more than 150 citations by the end of 2020 are:
Vigna Taglianti, A., Audisio, P. A., Biondi, M., Bologna, M. A., Carpaneto, G. M., De Biase, A., ... & Zapparoli, M. 
Halffter, G. 
Vigna Taglianti, A., Audisio, P. A., Belfiore, C., Biondi, M., Bologna, M. A., Carpaneto, G. M., ... & Zoia, S. 
Sindaco, R., Venchi, A., Carpaneto, G. M., & Bologna, M. A. 
The three most downloaded papers with more than 1000 views by the end of 2020 are:
Halffter, G. 
Amori, G., & Castiglia, R. 
Bianchi, C. N., & Morri, C.

References

External links 
 

Open access journals
Ecology journals
Geography journals
Publications established in 1970
English-language journals